Agraciada is a village located in southwestern Uruguay, on the border of Soriano Department with Colonia Department with parts in both departments.

History
On 28 June 1939 the status of the populated nucleus here was elevated to "Pueblo" (village) by the Act of Ley Nº 9.839.

Population 
According to the 2011 census, the town had a population of 586, of which 394 in the Soriano Department and 192 in the Colonia Department.
  
Source: Instituto Nacional de Estadística de Uruguay

References

External links 
INE map of Agraciada (Soriano)
INE map of Agraciada (Colonia)

Populated places in the Colonia Department
Populated places in the Soriano Department